House is a steamboat term referring to the cabin structure of a steamboat.  Generally the house includes every structure on steamboat built above the first deck, which is usually called the freight deck or the engine deck.

References 
 

Steamboats